The Akimiski Island Migratory Bird Sanctuary is a migratory bird sanctuary in Qikiqtaaluk, Nunavut, Canada. It is located on Akimiski Island within James Bay. The sanctuary, established by the Canadian government on 1 January 1941, has federal conservation status. It includes marine, intertidal, and subtidal components, and is rated Category Ib by the International Union for Conservation of Nature.

The coastal waters and wetlands are important feeding grounds for several varieties of migratory waterfowl and shorebirds. These include Atlantic brant, Canada goose, Caspian tern, Hudsonian godwit, lesser snow goose, red knot, and semipalmated plover.

Among mammalians, ringed seals, polar bears, and beluga whales can be found in the area.

Other designations
In addition to the migratory bird sanctuary designation, this area is an Important Bird Area, site #NU036. Most of the coastline has been designated as a key terrestrial habitat for migratory birds by the Canadian Wildlife Service.

References

External links
Akimiski Island Migratory Bird Sanctuary official website

Bird sanctuaries of Qikiqtaaluk Region
Important Bird Areas of Qikiqtaaluk Region
Migratory Bird Sanctuaries of Canada